Jamie Daniel McCart (born 20 June 1997) is a Scottish footballer, who plays as a defender for Leyton Orient on loan from Rotherham United. McCart has previously played for Celtic, St Mirren, Alloa Athletic, Inverness Caledonian Thistle and St Johnstone.

Club career
A product of Celtic's youth system, McCart made his competitive debut for the Glasgow club as a substitute against Motherwell in the Scottish League Cup during August 2016.

On 31 January 2017, McCart joined Inverness Caledonian Thistle on a loan deal until the end of the season. He then made an emergency loan move to St Mirren in September 2017, and returned to Celtic at the end of the year having made just three appearances for the Buddies. McCart moved on loan again in January 2018, joining Scottish League One side Alloa Athletic until the end of the season.

McCart returned to Inverness ahead of the 2018–19 season, signing a two-year contract with the club.

McCart signed a pre-contract agreement with St Johnstone in January 2020. Later in the month, Inverness and St Johnstone agreed a deal that allowed him to join the Saints immediately. He quickly established a defensive partnership with Jason Kerr and Liam Gordon.

On 27 June 2022 McCart signed a three-year contract with EFL Championship side Rotherham United, after signing a pre-contract earlier in the month. McCart made just one league start for Rotherham during the first half of the 2022–23 season, and he moved on loan to Leyton Orient in January 2023.

International career
In March 2017 he made his debut for the Scotland Under-21 side in a friendly against Estonia.

Selected for the Scotland under-20 squad in the 2017 Toulon Tournament. The team went to claim the bronze medal. It was the nations first ever medal at the competition.

Personal life
He is the son of former Motherwell defender Chris McCart, who is now the Head of Celtic's Youth Academy.

Career statistics

Honours
St Johnstone
Scottish Cup: 2020–21
Scottish League Cup: 2020–21

References

External links
Jamie McCart profile at Soccerbase

1997 births
Living people
Scottish footballers
Footballers from Bellshill
Association football defenders
Celtic F.C. players
Inverness Caledonian Thistle F.C. players
Scottish Professional Football League players
Scotland youth international footballers
Scotland under-21 international footballers
St Mirren F.C. players
Alloa Athletic F.C. players
St Johnstone F.C. players
Rotherham United F.C. players
Leyton Orient F.C. players